Abraham Ancer (born 27 February 1991) is a Mexican-American professional golfer who played on the PGA Tour and is currently playing on the LIV Golf tour. He won the 2018 Emirates Australian Open and the 2021 WGC-FedEx St. Jude Invitational for his first PGA Tour career victory.

Amateur career
Ancer was born in McAllen, Texas; raised partially in Reynosa, Mexico; and has dual American and Mexican citizenship. He attended Sharyland High School in Mission, Texas. He played college golf at Odessa College and the University of Oklahoma, from which he graduated in 2013 with a degree in General Studies.

During his one year at Odessa, Ancer was a first-team All-American and finished in a tie for second in the Junior College National Golf Championship. At Oklahoma, he saw his most success during his first year, winning twice while having the sixth-lowest scoring average in Oklahoma history of 72.03. During his entire career, he ended up second in all-time scoring average.

Professional career
Ancer turned professional in 2013. In December 2014, he tied for 35th place at the Web.com Tour Qualifying School final stage. He played on the Web.com Tour in 2015, where he finished runner-up at the Brasil Champions in March and won the Nova Scotia Open in July.

He finished 11th in the regular season money list, which earned him a PGA Tour card for the 2016 season. In his rookie year, Ancer didn't perform consistently, with a best finish of T-18 at the FedEx St. Jude Classic. He finished 190th in FedEx Cup points and couldn't maintain his card for the 2017 season, which sent him back to the Web.com Tour.

During the 2017 Web.com Tour, Ancer carded five top-5 finishes, including three runner-up finishes, which allowed him to secure his PGA Tour card for the 2018 season by finishing in 3rd place on the regular season money list.

During the 2018 season, Ancer finished 9th at the OHL Classic at Mayakoba, 8th at the Houston Open, 4th at the Quicken Loans National, 5th at the RBC Canadian Open, and 7th at the Dell Technologies Championship. The Quicken Loans National was part of the Open Qualifying Series and his high finish gave him an entry to the 2018 Open Championship, his first major championship, where he had rounds of 71 and 78 and missed the cut. In the PGA Tour season Ancer earned US$1.7 million and finished 60th in the FedEx Cup.

Ancer had a good start to the 2018–19 season with top-5 finishes in the CIMB Classic and the Shriners Hospitals for Children Open, results that lifted him into the world top-100 for the first time. He followed this up with a 5-stroke victory in the Australian Open, a week before representing Mexico in the World Cup of Golf. His Australian Open win gave him an entry to the 2019 Open Championship. Ancer finished second in the Northern Trust in August 2019 and ended the year by tying for 21st at the Tour Championship. This earned him $478,000 in FedEx Cup bonus money.

Ancer's strong play in 2019 qualified him for the 2019 Presidents Cup International team. The event was held at Royal Melbourne Golf Club in December 2019. The U.S. team defeated the Internationals 16–14. Ancer went 3–1–1. His lone loss came in the Sunday singles, 3 & 2 against U.S. playing-captain Tiger Woods. Ancer had told media prior to the event that he wanted to play Woods in singles. Woods said afterward "Abe wanted it, he got it."

At the 2020 RBC Heritage, Ancer finished runner-up shooting −21, earning him $773,900. Ancer led the tournament in Driving Accuracy (82.1%) and Greens In Regulation (90.3%).

In May 2021, Ancer finished second at the Wells Fargo Championship. One shot behind Rory McIlroy. In late July/early August he played in the 2020 Tokyo Olympics, finishing tied for 14th place with Norway's Viktor Hovland after scoring 12-under-par for the four rounds of the Men's Tournament. The following week he obtained his first career victory in a PGA Tour event after winning the 2021 WGC-FedEx St. Jude Invitational after two sudden-death playoff holes against Hideki Matsuyama and Sam Burns. With the win, Ancer became the fourth Mexican player to win on the PGA Tour and the first to win on the European Tour.

Ancer joined LIV Golf in June 2022 following the U.S Open, and was subsequently suspended from the PGA Tour. Ancer has yet to win individually on the tour, but did win the team trophy in Bangkok.

In February 2023, Ancer won the PIF Saudi International on the Asian Tour. He shot a final-round 68 to win by two shots ahead of Cameron Young and claim a wire-to-wire victory.

Amateur wins
2009 Odessa College Invitational
2010 Omega Chemical/Midland College, Texas Junior College Championship, NJCAA District 2 Championship
2011 Desert Shootout, NCAA East-VA Tech Regional

Source:

Professional wins (4)

PGA Tour wins (1)

PGA Tour playoff record (1–0)

European Tour wins (1)

European Tour playoff record (1–0)

Asian Tour wins (1)

PGA Tour of Australasia wins (1)

Web.com Tour wins (1)

Web.com Tour playoff record (1–1)

Results in major championships
Results not in chronological order before 2019 and in 2020.

CUT = missed the half-way cut
"T" = tied
NT = No tournament due to COVID-19 pandemic

Summary

Most consecutive cuts made – 6 (2020 PGA – 2021 PGA)
Longest streak of top-10s – 1 (twice)

Results in The Players Championship

"T" indicates a tie for a place
C = Cancelled after the first round due to the COVID-19 pandemic

World Golf Championships

Wins (1)

Results timeline

1Cancelled due to COVID-19 pandemic

QF, R16, R32, R64 = Round in which player lost in match play
NT = no tournament
"T" = tied
Note that the Championship and Invitational were discontinued from 2022.

Team appearances
World Cup (representing Mexico): 2018
Presidents Cup (representing the International team): 2019

See also
2015 Web.com Tour Finals graduates
2017 Web.com Tour Finals graduates

References

External links

Mexican male golfers
PGA Tour golfers
LIV Golf players
Olympic golfers of Mexico
Golfers at the 2020 Summer Olympics
Korn Ferry Tour graduates
Odessa Wranglers men's golfers
Oklahoma Sooners men's golfers
Golfers from San Antonio
People from McAllen, Texas
People from Reynosa
Sportspeople from Tamaulipas
1991 births
Living people